Fits and Starts is an art work by Brooklyn, New York City artist Marc Swanson, 
the 2005 vandalism of which at DePauw University created controversy.

The sculpture
Fits and Starts was a life-size sculpture of a deer in mid-leap that was entirely encrusted in rhinestone crystals. It was made of steel and polyurethane foam. The sculpture was installed near DePauw's East College building on 4 November 2005. The artwork combined the influence of his politically conservative father, an Eagle Scout and US Marine, and Swanson's identity as a gay male. The Butler Family Foundation, which "is committed to supporting the acquisition of contemporary sculpture created by emerging artists of promise and established artists of note," paid US$60 000 to donate the sculpture to DePauw.

Vandalism
DePauw students hit the sculpture with various objects, and parts of the deer's antlers were sawed off. After the vandalism, the artwork was removed and stored in the basement of the Peeler Art Center at DePauw University.  In the fall of 2008, restoration of the sculpture was completed and the deer now stands on the second story of the art center.

References

External links
The sculpture in its original outdoor display
Fits and Starts: A Deer Diary 35min student documentary on YouTube
Live Webcam View Fits and Starts in Real Time

DePauw University
Controversies in the United States
Outdoor sculptures in Indianapolis
LGBT art in the United States
2005 sculptures
Polyurethane sculptures
Deer in art
Vandalized works of art in Indiana